The Woman Next Door is a 1981 French romantic drama film directed by François Truffaut. Reminiscent of the medieval legend of Tristan and Iseult but set among young middle-class people in a provincial city, it tells the story of a fatal romance between a loving husband (Gérard Depardieu) and the attractive woman (Fanny Ardant) who moves in next door. The last of Truffaut's serious films, being followed by the more light-hearted Vivement dimanche!, it was the 39th highest-grossing film of the year, with a total of 1,087,600 admissions in France.

Plot
Bernard lives happily with his wife Arlette and young son Thomas in a village outside Grenoble. One day a married couple, Philippe and Mathilde, move into the house next door. Bernard and Mathilde are shocked at meeting each other because years before, when both single, they had a stormy affair that ended painfully. At first Bernard avoids Mathilde, until a chance meeting in a supermarket reawakens long-buried passions and soon, while openly good neighbours, in secret they pursue an affair. Though both find the strain of living their normal family and working lives unbearable, it is Bernard who cracks first. After publicly revealing his violent passion for Mathilde at a garden party, he keeps away from her and the two households try to get on with their lives. But the rejected Mathilde then cracks and, after publicly collapsing at the tennis club, is hospitalised with depression. When she is released, she finds that to get far away from Bernard her husband has moved them out of the village. One night Bernard is woken by a banging shutter on the empty house next door and gets up to investigate. In the house, he spots Mathilde in the darkness. After they have made love on the bare floor, taking a gun out of her handbag she shoots first him and then herself.

Cast
 Gérard Depardieu as Bernard Coudray
 Fanny Ardant as Mathilde Bauchard
 Henri Garcin as Philippe Bauchard
  as Arlette Coudray
  as Roland Duguet
 Véronique Silver as Madame Odile Jouve
 Philippe Morier-Genoud as doctor
 Olivier Becquaert as Thomas Coudray

References

External links
 
 
 

1981 films
1981 romantic drama films
1980s French-language films
Adultery in films
Films directed by François Truffaut
Films scored by Georges Delerue
Films set in France
Films shot in Isère
Films with screenplays by François Truffaut
French romantic drama films
TF1 Films Production films
1980s French films